Sir Thomas Hales, 2nd Baronet (24 February 1665/66 – 7 January 1748), of Bekesbourne and Brymore in Kent, was an English politician who sat in the English and British House of Commons between 1701 and 1747.

Hales was the eldest son of Thomas Hales of Howletts, Bekesbourne and his wife Mary Wood, daughter of Richard Wood of Abbots Langley, Hertfordshire.

He was baptised on 1 March 1665/66 at Saint Peter's, Bekesbourne, Kent, England

He was admitted at Inner Temple in 1683 and subsequently travelled abroad in France. His father died in 1692, and in December 1693, he inherited the baronetcy on the death of his grandfather Sir Robert Hales, who had been created a baronet at the Restoration.

Hales was returned as a Tory Member of Parliament for Kent at the first general election of 1701. He topped the poll in a contest at the second general election of 1701 and was returned unopposed at the 1702 English general election. He did not stand in 1705.  He stood for Nottinghamshire at a by-election in June 1711, but was unsuccessful.

At the 1715 British general election Hales was returned as Whig MP for Canterbury and was then rewarded with an appointment to the commission for forfeited estates with a salary of £1,000 a year. He supported the Administration, except in 1719, when he voted against the Peerage Bill. He was re-elected for Canterbury in 1722 and 1727. Hales voted for the excise bill and at the 1734 British general election, he was defeated in the poll, but was returned on petition on 11 April 1735. He was defeated at the 1741 British general election and was not returned until a by-election on 23 January 1746. He was defeated at the 1747 general election and did not stand again.

Hales married Mary Pym (d. 1729), daughter of Sir Charles Pym, 1st Baronet of Brymore, in 1688, and their children included:
 Sir Thomas Hales (c. 1694–1762), who succeeded to the baronetcy
 Mary Hales, who married Sir Brook Bridges, 1st Baronet (d. 1728), of Goodneston
 Catherine Hales, who married Edward Cook of Canterbury
 Anne Hales
 Elizabeth Hales, who married (first) Benjamin Lethiemillier of East Shen and (second) Charles Pyott of St. Martin's
His younger brother Stephen Hales was a curate who became a famous scientist, inventor and philanthropist.

References

External links
 Hales genealogy
 England Births and Christenings, 1538-1975 @ FamilySearch
 Kent, Canterbury Archdeaconry Baptisms Image @ Findmypast
Robert Beatson, A Chronological Register of Both Houses of Parliament (London: Longman, Hurst, Res & Orme, 1807) 

|-

1666 births
1748 deaths
Baronets in the Baronetage of England
Whig (British political party) MPs
English MPs 1701
English MPs 1701–1702
English MPs 1702–1705
Members of the Parliament of Great Britain for English constituencies
British MPs 1715–1722
British MPs 1722–1727
British MPs 1727–1734
British MPs 1734–1741
British MPs 1741–1747
Politics of Canterbury
People from Bekesbourne